Genoa Cricket and Football Club, commonly referred to as Genoa, is a professional football club based in Genoa, Liguria, Italy, that competes in , the second division of the Italian football league system.

Established in 1893, Genoa is Italy's oldest football team, and the oldest Italian football team still active with over 125 years of history. During their long history, Genoa have won the Italian Championship 9 times. Genoa's first title came at the inaugural championship in 1898 and their most recent was in 1923–24. They have also won the Coppa Italia once. Historically, Genoa are the fourth most successful Italian club in terms of championships won. Genoa CFC have played their home games Stadio Luigi Ferraris since 1911.

In 2011 Genoa was included in the "International Bureau of Cultural Capitals" (a sort of historical sporting heritage of humanity, in line with that of UNESCO) at the request of President Xavier Tudela. In 2013 was also admitted to the "Club of Pioneers", an association that brings together the oldest football clubs in the world which already included Sheffield F.C. and Recreativo de Huelva.

History

The club was founded on 7 September 1893 as Genoa Cricket & Athletic Club. In its earliest years, it principally competed in athletics and cricket. Association football was only a secondary concern. Since the club was set up to represent England abroad, the original shirts worn by the organisation were white, the same colour as the England national team shirt. At first Italians were not permitted to join as it was a British sporting club abroad. Genoa's activities took place in the north-west of the city in the Campasso area, at the Piazza d'Armi. The men who initially handled the management of the club were;

On 10 April 1897 the footballing section of the club, already existing from 1893, became predominant thanks to James Richardson Spensley. It was among the oldest in Italian football at the time, the only other founded clubs were four in Turin. Italians were allowed to join and found a new ground in the form of Ponte Carrega.
The first friendly match took place at home, against a mixed team of Internazionale Torino and F.B.C. Torinese; Genoa lost 1–0. Not long after, Genoa recorded its first victory away against UPS Alessandria winning 2–0.

Championship dominance

Football in Italy stepped up a level with the creation of the Italian Football Federation and the Italian Football Championship. Genoa competed in the first Italian Championship in 1898 at Velodrome Humbert I in Turin. They defeated Ginnastica Torino 2–1 in their first official game on 8 May, before winning the first championship later that day by beating Internazionale Torino 3–1 after extra-time.

Genoa returned for the following season, this time with a few changes; the name of the club was altered to Genoa Cricket & Football Club, dropping the Athletic from its name. A change in shirt colour was also in order, as they changed to white and blue vertical stripes; known in Italy as biancoblù. Genoa won their second title in a one-day tournament which took place on 16 April 1899, by beating Internazionale Torino 3–1 for the second time. On their way to winning their third consecutive title in 1900 and also beating local rivals Sampierdarenese 7–0; a winning margin which would not be bettered by any team in the league until 1910. The final was secured with a 3–1 win over F.B.C. Torinese.

The club strip was changed again in 1901, Genoa adopted its famous red-navy halves and therefore became known as the rossoblù; these are the colours used even to this day as with many other Italian clubs, such as Cagliari, Bologna, Crotone and an endless list of minor clubs. After a season of finishing runners-up to Milan Cricket and Football Club, things were back on track in 1902 with their fourth title. Juventus emerged as serious contenders to Genoa's throne from 1903 onwards, when for two seasons in a row Genoa beat the Old Lady in the national final.

Notably Genoa became the first Italian football team to play an international match, when they visited France on 27 April 1903 to play FVC Nice, winning the fixture 3–0. As well as winning the Italian championship in 1904, the year was also notable for Genoa reserves winning the first ever II Categoria league season; a proto-Serie B under the top level. From 1905 onwards when they were runners-up, Genoa lost their foothold on the Italian championship; other clubs such as Juventus, Milan and Pro Vercelli stepped up.

The fall in part during this period can be traced back to 1908 when FIGC agreed to Federal Gymnastics protests forbidding the use of foreign players. Since Genoa's birth they had always had a strong English contingent. They disagreed, as did several other prominent clubs such as Milan, Torino and Firenze; as thus they withdrew from official FIGC competitions that year. The following season the federation reversed the decision and Genoa was rebuilt with players such as Luigi Ferraris and some from Switzerland, such as Daniel Hug who came from FC Basel. The rebuilding of the squad also saw the creation of a new ground in the Marassi area of Genoa, when built it had a capacity of 25,000 and was comparable to British stadiums of the time; it was officially opened on 22 January 1911.

Garbutt revival
With the introduction of the Italy national football team, Genoa played an important part, with the likes of Renzo De Vecchi; who was azzurri captain for some time, Edoardo Mariani and Enrico Sardi earning call-ups. Englishman William Garbutt was brought in as head coach to help revive the club; Garbutt was the first professional manager in Italy and was renowned for being highly charismatic, and also for constantly smoking his tobacco pipe. He was dubbed "Mister" by the players; since then Italians have referred to coaches in general by the term.

Finally by 1914–15, Genoa had restored themselves as the top club from Northern Italy, winning the final round of the Northern section. However, this particular year, the national final could not be played because of the outbreak of World War I, the finals of the Southern Italian section could not be decided and thus Genoa did not have a team to play. Genoa would be awarded the title in 1919 after the end of the war, it would be their first for eleven seasons. The war took a harsh toll on Genoa as players Luigi Ferraris, Adolfo Gnecco, Carlo Marassi, Alberto Sussone and Claudio Casanova all died while on military duty in Italy; while footballing founder James Richardson Spensley was killed in Germany.

In the early part of the next decade, Genoa remained strong contenders in the Northern section. Garbutt led Genoa to championship success in 1922–23; beating Lazio 6–1 in the final, over the course of two legs. The following season, Genoa made their way past Bologna in the Northern finals, but not without controversy; after riots in the second leg during the game in Bologna, the game was called off and FIGC awarded Genoa a 2–0 victory. In the national final that season, Genoa beat Savoia 4–1 over the course of two legs; this would be their ninth and to date final Italian championship.

The squad during these two championship victories included; Giovanni De Prà, Ottavio Barbieri, Luigi Burlando and Renzo De Vecchi. With Genoa's championship victory in 1923–24 came the introduction of the scudetto patch; which means following the season within which a club wins an Italian league championship, they are allowed to wear a shield shaped patch on their shirt which features the colours of the Italian flag. For the rest of the 1920s, the club's highest finish was in second place: the 1927–28 season when Genoa finished runners-up to Torino, with striker Felice Levratto scoring 20 goals in 27 games.

Genova 1893 period
Due to the strongly British connotations attached to the name, Genoa were forced to change it by the fascist government to Genova 1893 Circolo del Calcio in 1928. The club competed in a proto-European Cup in the form of the Mitropa Cup, where they went out in the quarter-finals after losing heavily to Rapid Vienna. They followed this with a runners-up position back at home in the league, they finished behind Ambrosiana in the 1929–30 season; this would be their last top level championship runners-up spot to date.

The club's league form became highly erratic during the early 1930s, with varying league positions; it was during the 1933–34 season that Genova suffered their first ever relegation to Serie B, the second league of Italian football. Thankfully for the club, they were able to bounce back under the management of Vittorio Faroppa, winning promotion by finishing top of their group ahead of Novara. In 1936, the ambitious Juan Culiolo took over as chairman of the club; in 1936–37 they achieved a 6th-place finish and also won the Coppa Italia by beating Roma 1–0 with a goal from Mario Torti.

During the following season Genova finished in third place, this was a particularly tight season with winners Ambrosiana-Inter finishing only three points ahead of the club. That summer Italy competed in the 1938 FIFA World Cup and won, three Genova players formed part of the triumphant squad in the form of Sergio Bertoni, Mario Genta and Mario Perazzolo. The club finished the decade on a high, maintaining a top five foothold in the top level of the Italian football league system.

World War II affected dramatically the entire Italian football movement, but Genova did not recover as well as other clubs. In 1945, the club chose to revert their name to Genoa Cricket and Foot-Ball Club, the one which they had used in the very early days of the Italian championship. In the years just after the war, the club were still popular with the fans, with people previously associated with the club such as Ottavio Barbieri and William Garbutt returning for managerial spells. Genoa also had a new rival in the form of Sampdoria, who were founded by a merger of two other clubs in 1946 and would groundshare at Stadio Luigi Ferraris.

Post-war period

After the Second World War the ability of Genoa to finish in the upper ranks of Serie A declined in a significant manner; throughout the rest of the 1940s the club were middle-table finishers. The 1948–49 season saw three highly significant results, Genoa beat Inter 4–1, the famous Grande Torino side 3–0 and Padova 7–1. The 1950s started in poor fashion for the club, they had bought Argentine Mario Boyé from Boca Juniors but he stayed only one season and the club were relegated after finishing bottom of the table, but after two seasons they achieved their return after winning Serie B, ahead of Legnano. Ragnar Nikolay Larsen was a notable player for the club during this period and they sustained mid-table finishes for the rest of the decade.

Despite suffering a relegation in 1959–60 and then a promotion back up to Serie A in 1961–62, Genoa had a respectable amount of cup success in the first half of the 1960s. The club won the Coppa delle Alpi in 1962; it was the first time the competition had been competed between club teams instead of international ones, the final was played at home while Genoa beat French club Grenoble Foot 38 by 1–0 with a goal from Nizza. Genoa won the same competition again two years later, the final was held at the Wankdorf Stadium in Berne, Switzerland; Genoa defeated Catania 2–0, with both goals from Giampaolo Piaceri to take the trophy.

The celebrations for the club did not last long however, as the year following their last cup success they were relegated down to Serie B again. This time their stay in the second tier of the Italian football league system would be far longer than previous relegations, the club was unstable as it changed manager each season. Genoa even experienced their first relegation to Serie C in 1970, financially the club fell into difficulties and had several ownership changes.

Mixed times
Throughout the 1970s, Genoa would mostly play in the second tier. Under the management of Arturo Silvestri the club made its way back to Serie A for the 1973–74 season, but they were relegated straight back down. For the return of Il Grifone to Serie A a couple of seasons later, the squad featured the likes of Roberto Rosato, Bruno Conti and a young Roberto Pruzzo. This time they stuck it out in the top division for two seasons before succumbing to relegation in 1977–78; the relegation was particularly cruel as the side above them Fiorentina survived on goal-difference of just a single goal, the two teams had played each other on the final day of the season ending in a 0–0 draw.

The relegation was bad for the club in more ways than one, they lost some of their top players who could have offered them a swift return; such as Roberto Pruzzo's move to Roma where he would go on to have great success. After a couple of middle-table finishes in Serie B, Genoa earned promotion during the 1980–81 season under manager Luigi Simoni, the club finished as runners-up behind only AC Milan who had been relegated the previous season for their part in the Totonero betting scandal.

Still with Simoni at the helm as manager, Genoa were able to survive in Serie A for their returning season, finishing just one point ahead of the relegated AC Milan. In a dramatic last day of the season, Genoa were trailing 2–1 to Napoli with five minutes left, until on the 85th minute Mario Faccenda scored the goal that secured the point needed by Genoa, starting an owing friendship between the two club's fans.
A couple of seasons later in 1983–84, Genoa would not be so lucky, despite beating champions Juventus on the final day of the season, the club were relegated even though they finished the season with the same number of points as surviving Lazio; this was because Lazio had recorded better results in matches against Genoa.

European experience
The club was purchased by Calabrese entrepreneur Aldo Spinelli in 1985 and despite no longer having Simoni as manager, Genoa were finishing in the top half of Serie B. After a slip in form during 1987–88 (failing to be promoted by a mere point in 1986–87, then having to struggle not to be retroceded the following season, being spared that fate again by a mere point), Genoa refocused their energy and were able to achieve promotion back into Serie A in 1988–89, finishing as champions ahead of Bari. Genoa, with an experienced trainer as Osvaldo Bagnoli who knew how to get the best out of underdog teams (he managed to win a championship at the helm of Hellas Verona in the eighties) and with a team sporting the talents of Carlos Aguilera and Tomáš Skuhravý among others achieved highs during the 1990–91 season where they finished fourth, remaining undefeated at home for the entire campaign, winning games against all the big sides including Juventus, Inter, Milan, Roma, Lazio, Fiorentina, Napoli, as well as their local rivals Sampdoria who won the title that season.

Subsequently, the club gained entry to the UEFA Cup in the 1991–92 season. Genoa had a good run, making it to the semi-finals before being knocked out by Ajax, that season's winners of the competition; notably Genoa did the double over Liverpool in the quarter-finals, becoming the first Italian side to beat the Reds at Anfield. Unfortunately for Genoa, this success was soon followed by a 'Dark Age' following the departure of Osvaldo Bagnoli (who chose to move away from Genoa to spend more time with his daughter, whose health was rapidly declining) and the failure of the management to replace key players as they grew old or were ceded to other teams. Noted Genoa players during this period included Gianluca Signorini, Carlos Aguilera, Stefano Eranio, Roberto Onorati and John van 't Schip.
It has to be said that chairman Spinelli had a very different management approach from that of most businessmen turned football club owners.
While his colleagues saw football as a marketing and public relation investment and were quite ready to siphon funds out of their main business to keep their teams afloat and replenish their player roster Spinelli saw Genoa as another business whose main aim was that of generating revenue for its owner (namely, himself) and so was more than happy to sell esteemed players for hefty revenues of which just a minimal fraction was then re-invested in the team, often for the acquisition of lesser-valued replacements or virtual unknowns. Thus he proved all-too-eager to sell Uruguayan striker Carlos Aguilera and to replace him with the markedly inferior Kazuyoshi Miura from Japanese side Yomiuri Verdy (a deal that especially pleased him since the Japanese sponsors were actually paying him to let Miura play in Serie A).
The same season as their UEFA Cup run, they finished just one place above the relegation zone; in the seasons following Genoa remained in the lower half of the table.

During the 1994–95 season, Genoa were narrowly relegated; they finished level on points with Padova after the normal season period. This meant a relegation play-out was to be played between the two in Florence. The game was tied 1–1 at full-time and went to a penalty shoot-out. Genoa eventually lost the shoot-out 5–4. While back down in Serie B, the club had another taste of international cup success when they became the final winners of the Anglo-Italian Cup by beating Port Vale 5–2 with Gennaro Ruotolo scoring a hat-trick. Chairman Spinelli sold Genoa in 1997, moving onto other clubs (Alessandria and, then Livorno). The late 1990s and early 2000s would be the most trying time in the history of the club, with constant managerial changes, a poor financial situation and little hope of gaining promotion, outside of a decent 6th-place finish in 1999–00. From 1997 until 2003, Genoa had a total of three different owners and four different chairmen, before the club was passed on to the toys and games tycoon from Irpinia, Enrico Preziosi, already chairman of Como, a football club he previously owned.

Recent times

Preziosi took over in 2003, when Genoa should have been relegated to C1 series after a dismal season, but was instead "saved" along with Catania and Salernitana by the football federation's controversial decision to extend Serie B to 24 teams. Things started to look up for Genoa; they won Serie B in 2004–05. However, allegations were raised that the club had fixed a match on the last day of the season between themselves and Venezia. The 3–2 victory in the match saw Genoa win the league, with a draw having been good enough to maintain its position in the end. The Disciplinary Committee of FIGC saw fit to instead place Genoa bottom of the league and relegate them down to Serie C1 with a three-point deduction on 27 July 2005.

For their season in Serie C1 for 2005–06, Genoa were hit with a six-point penalty from the previous season. After leading for much of the season, they eventually finished as runners-up and were entered into the play-offs, beating Monza 2–1 on aggregate to achieve promotion back into Serie B. During the summer break Gian Piero Gasperini was brought in as the new manager, he helped the club to gain promotion during the 2006–07 season, it was ensured on the last day of the season where they drew a 0–0 with Napoli, both clubs were happily promoted back into Serie A.

The 2007–08 season, the first Serie A championship played by Genoa in 12 years, saw it finishing in a respectable tenth place, right after the "big ones" of Italian football.

A careful summer market session saw chairman, Preziosi strengthening the core of the team while parting from some players on favourable economical terms (for example selling striker Marco Borriello to AC Milan for a hefty sum). Genoa's aims for the 2008–09 season were set on a UEFA Cup spot. This was achieved after a strong season which saw the team finish 5th in Serie A, besting traditional powerhouses like Juventus, Roma, and Milan, and winning both Genoa derbies against Sampdoria, with Diego Milito finishing among the top scorers of the championship. Genoa subsequently lost Milito and midfielder Thiago Motta to Internazionale, but were able to bring in striker Hernán Crespo. Things however did not go as planned, with the injury-plagued team eliminated in the early stages of the Europa League and Coppa Italia and falling to a ninth-place finish in Serie A in 2010.

In the 2010–11 season, Genoa, whose ranks had been revolutionised once again save for some long-serving players, struggled along in the mid-positions of the league; a slew of questionable results early in the season led chairman Preziosi to fire trainer Gian Piero Gasperini, who had led the team since the 2007–08 season, and to select Davide Ballardini as his successor. The newcomers, despite not securing memorable successes, kept the team steadily afloat in the "left part" of the ranking, managing to win two consecutive derby matches against rivals Sampdoria in December and May.

The 2011–12 and 2012–13 seasons saw Genoa place in 17th both times, one spot away from relegation to Serie B.

In the 2014–15 season, Genoa, in sixth place and set to qualify for the UEFA Europa League qualifying round, were denied a UEFA license because they filed paperwork late and because the Stadio Luigi Ferraris was not currently up to standard for UEFA competition. The spot was passed on to 7th placed Sampdoria.

On 7 September 2018, the 125th anniversary of the club's foundation was celebrated. A celebration parade occurred in the city of Genoa during the night of 7 September 2018; a banner of several meters was dedicated to the tragedy of the collapse of the Ponte Morandi bridge.

777 Partners 
On 23 September 2021 it was announced that Genoa had been acquired by 777 Partners, a US-based private investment firm founded by Steven W. Pasko and Josh Wander. While terms were not publicly released, sources close to the deal revealed that the team was acquired for its enterprise value of $175 million.

Cricket
Early on, the club transformed from a multi-sport club to one exclusively focused on football. In 2007, a group of club supporters formed a section dedicated to cricket. It currently competes under the name Genoa Cricket Club 1893 in Serie A of the Italian cricket league.

Players

Squad

Out on loan

Youth team

Retired numbers

 6 –  Gianluca Signorini, sweeper, 1988–95
 7 –  Marco Rossi, MF, 2003–04, 2005–13
 12 – The fans of Gradinata Nord, "the twelfth man"

Notable players

Chairmen history
Below is the chairmen ( or ) history of Genoa, from when the club was first founded playing cricket and athletics, until the present day.

Coaching staff

Managerial history
Genoa have had many managers and trainers, some seasons they have had co-managers running the team, here is a chronological list of them from 1896 when they became a football club, onwards.

Colours, badge and nicknames

As Genoa was a British-run club, the first ever colours were those of the England national football team. Not long into the club's footballing history, the kit was changed to white and blue stripes in 1899; the blue was chosen to represent the sea as Genoa is a port city. In 1901 the club finally settled for their most famous red and blue halves shirt, this gained them the nickname of rossoblù together with Bologna, Cagliari and many more minor clubs.

One of the nicknames of Genoa is Il Grifone which means "the griffin"; this is derived from the coat of arms belonging to the city of Genoa. The coat of arms features two golden griffins, either side of the Saint George's Cross. As well as being present on both the flag and coat of arms of the city of Genoa, the cross is evocative of the club's English founders. St. George was also the patron saint of the former Republic of Genoa. The actual club badge of Genoa Cricket and Football Club is heavily derived from the city coat of arms, but also incorporated the club's red and blue colours.

Supporters and rivalries

Genoa CFC has the bulk of its fans in Liguria, however they are also popular in Piedmont and the Aosta Valley. The seafaring traditions of the Genoese and the presence of Genoese communities in distant countries did much to spread the appeal of Genoa some further than just Italy, and immigrants founded fan clubs in Buenos Aires, Amsterdam, Tokyo, Toronto, New York, San Francisco, Barcelona, Iceland and other places.

The most significant and traditional rivalry for Genoa, is the inner-city one with the club with whom they share a ground; Sampdoria. The two clubs compete together in the heated Derby della Lanterna ("Derby of the Lantern"); a reference to the Lighthouse of Genoa. Genoa's supporters also have a strong distaste for AC Milan. A clash between opposing supporters in January 1995 resulted in the death of Genoese Vincenzo Spagnolo, who was stabbed to death by Milanese Simone Barbaglia. The assailant was a member of an informal group of football hooligans dubbed "The Barbour Ones", who used to routinely carry bladed weapons to matches, a practice made possible by the lax security measures of the time.

Conversely, the fans of Genoa have long standing friendships with Napoli (which goes back to the 1982 last match of the season). On the last day of the 2006–07 season, Genoa and Napoli drew a practical 0–0 ensuring both were promoted back into Serie A; Genoa ultras could be seen holding up banners saying "Benvenuto fratello napoletano", meaning, "Welcome, Neapolitan brother," and the two sets of fans celebrated together in a warm and ever-co-operating manner.

On the other hand, the amicable relationship with the red-and-yellow supporters of Roma, fostered by the cession of striker Roberto Pruzzo in 1979 and lasting for most of the 80's has, in recent years, cooled up a bit while another strong fraternity, which saw Genoese football fans on friendly terms with Torino (since the exchange of Gigi Meroni between the two clubs at the end of the 1963–64 season and his untimely death on 15 October 1967) has perhaps broken-down for good after the Torino-Genoa match of season 2008–09.

Starved for points and risking a humiliating relegation (one of many in a troubled recent history) the Turinese fans expected a friendly treatment from Genoa, which, in the heat of a pitched battle with Fiorentina for the fourth place (which could have won a Champions League spot for the team) did not comply, soundly beating Torino and to many effects sealing its fate. When during early August 2009 Genoa scheduled a friendly match with Nice in southern Piedmont, many Turinese hooligans travelled to the match location with the precise intention of starting trouble and disorder to "get even" with Genoa and its fans.

In Europe

UEFA Cup/Europa League

Honours

National titles

League
Italian Football Championship / Northern League / Serie A:
Winners (9): 1898, 1899, 1900, 1902, 1903, 1904, 1914–15, 1922–23, 1923–24
Serie B: 6
 Winners: 1934–35, 1952–53, 1961–62, 1972–73, 1975–76, 1988–89
Serie C / Serie C1: 1 (North)
Winners: 1970–71

Cups
Coppa Italia: 1
 Winners: 1936–37
 Runners-up: 1939–40

Other Titles
Coppa delle Alpi: 2
Winners: 1962, 1964
Anglo-Italian Cup: 1
Winners: 1996

Youth titles 
Campionato Nazionale Primavera: 1
Winners: 2009–10

Coppa Italia Primavera: 1
Winners: 2008–09

Primavera Super Cup: 2
Winners: 2009, 2010

Torneo di Viareggio: 2
Winners: 1965, 2007

Campionato Nazionale Under-18: 1 
Winners: 2020–21

Campionato Nazionale Under-17:
 Runners-up: 2020–21

Campionato Nazionale giovanile: 2
Winners: 1939, 1942

Presence in Italian professional leagues

The total from 1897–98 includes 105 seasons at a national level from the inception of the Italian football league, including 27 seasons of Prima Categoria and Prima Divisione (from 1898 to 1922 the name of the Italian Football Championship was Prima Categoria). Seasons included Prima Categoria 1906–1907 too, where the Grifoni didn't pass the regional elimination round, and Prima Categoria 1907–1908, where Genoa didn't enter the tournament.

Kit suppliers and shirt sponsors

See also 

 Dynasties in Italian football
 Club of Pioneers
 Genoa C.F.C. Women

Bibliography

Footnotes

References

External links

 
 Genoa CFC at Serie A 
 Genoa CFC at UEFA.com

 
1893 establishments in Italy
Association football clubs established in 1893
Coppa Italia winning clubs
Football clubs in Genoa
Football clubs in Italy
Italian football First Division clubs
Serie A clubs
Serie A winning clubs
Serie B clubs
Serie C clubs